Cedar Park is a neighborhood of Philadelphia, Pennsylvania. Located in the larger West Philadelphia district, it stretches north to Larchwood Ave., south to Kingsessing Ave., east to 46th Street, and west to 52nd Street.

Originally outlying farmland, Cedar Park was built between 1850 and 1910 as a streetcar suburb of Center City. Its development as a suburb accelerated with the installation of horsecars in the 1850s and again with the arrival of electric trolley lines in 1892.

It is racially and ethnically diverse, and much of the historic Queen Anne-style architecture still stands.

Since about 2000, the neighborhood has been undergoing gentrification stimulated by the University of Pennsylvania's redevelopment plan for West Philadelphia. There is a distinct progressive-politics mien to the neighborhood and a sizable African immigrant community located along and near Baltimore Avenue between 46th and 49th Streets. Cedar Park's residents are predominantly Jamaican/Caribbean and African immigrants, but many are African American (American-born blacks) or white.

Gallery

See also

 St. Francis de Sales Church

External links
 Cedar Park Neighborhood Association
 InfoResources West Philadelphia Neighborhood - Cedar Park

References

Neighborhoods in Philadelphia
Streetcar suburbs
University City, Philadelphia